Commerce City/72nd station (sometimes stylized as Commerce City•72nd) is a station on the N Line of the Denver RTD commuter rail system in Commerce City, Colorado. It is the second station northbound from Union Station and is located at the west end of 72nd Avenue. Access to the Bennet R. Fernald Trail is provided at the southern end of the station. The station opened on September 21, 2020.

References 

RTD commuter rail stations
Railway stations in the United States opened in 2020
2020 establishments in Colorado
Commerce City, Colorado